Jabuka TV (lit. "Apple TV"), formerly known as Otvorena televizija ("Open TV"), is a local television station in Zagreb, Croatia.

History

It began broadcasting in 1989 as OTV (Omladinska TV), becoming the first commercial television station on the territories of former Yugoslavia, as well as the first independent television house. It played a major role in the further development of freedom of speech in the country, since it allowed politics and views which were previously rare or risky to espouse. It, thus, became one of the leading local TV channels in the country, and an alternative to state television. It changed its name to Otvorena Televizija in 1994.

In 2011, it was rebranded as Jabuka TV (Apple TV).

Notable shows
Serbus Zagreb (1989–)
Nightmare Stage (1992–2005)
Večernja škola (1995–1998)
Laku noć, Hrvatska (2006–2008)

References

External links
 

Television channels in Croatia
Mass media in Zagreb
Croatian-language television stations
Television channels and stations established in 1989